Lê Duy Phường (黎維祊, 1709–1735) was the twelfth and fifth-last emperor of Vietnamese Lê dynasty. He was imprisoned shortly after his reign began and reigned under arrest from 1729 to 1732 until he was murdered by Trịnh Giang, and was succeeded by his older brother, Lê Thuần Tông.

References

 
 

H
1709 births
1735 deaths
Vietnamese monarchs